The 2014 NRL Grand Final was the concluding and premiership-deciding match of the 2014 NRL season. Played on the evening of Sunday 5 October 2014 at ANZ Stadium, the match was contested by the South Sydney Rabbitohs and the Canterbury-Bankstown Bulldogs. South Sydney won the match with a decisive 30 points to 6 victory, ending a 43-year premiership drought by claiming their 21st title. South Sydney forward Sam Burgess, who suffered a broken cheekbone from the game's opening tackle, was awarded the Clive Churchill Medal as the best player on ground.

The match was preceded by the 2014 National Youth Competition Grand Final and the 2014 NRL State Championship. British-American musician and songwriter Slash and American alternative rock band Train performed at the event as pre-match entertainment, and Simon Gleeson performed the Australian National anthem. The match was broadcast live throughout in Australia by the Nine Network.

Background

History
Founded in 1908, Souths had won more premierships—20—than any other club. However, they had not appeared in a Grand Final since 1971. Over the subsequent decades, the club had battled financial problems before being excluded from the National Rugby League competition ahead of the 2000 season due to a failure to meet the league's criteria for inclusion. After litigation and high-profile public campaigns, the club was readmitted into the competition for the 2002 season.

For Canterbury, founded in 1934, the Grand Final was the club's 18th. Their most recent Grand Final appearance was a 2012 defeat to Melbourne, with their last premiership coming in 2004 against the Sydney Roosters.

The clubs had met each other in just one previous Grand Final in 1967, with South Sydney prevailing 12-10.

2014 season
South Sydney finished the regular season in third position, before defeating Manly and the Sydney Roosters in the finals series. Canterbury finished in seventh place, and made the grand final after successive sudden-death victories over Melbourne, Manly and Penrith.

Both sides had met each other twice during the course of the season, in rounds 7 and 25. The two teams were tied 1 apiece, with Canterbury winning the first encounter 15-14, and South Sydney winning the second encounter 21-14.

Teams

Both teams' first choice hookers were ruled out from playing in the week leading up to the Grand Final:
For South Sydney, Issac Luke was suspended for a dangerous throw in the Preliminary Final against Sonny Bill Williams of the Sydney Roosters and was replaced by Apisai Koroisau.
For Canterbury, captain Michael Ennis withdrew after suffering a fractured foot in the Preliminary Final against the Penrith Panthers; he was replaced by Moses Mbye as hooker, and the captaincy was shared between James Graham and Trent Hodkinson.

Match report

The first half of the match was a low-scoring affair. There was only one try—to South Sydney's Alex Johnston—while Adam Reynolds kicked a penalty goal to give Souths a 6–0 half-time lead.  Canterbury equalised ten minutes into the second half through a converted try to Tony Williams. George Burgess restored Souths' lead shortly thereafter, before further tries to Kirisome Auva'a, Reynolds and Greg Inglis in the final ten minutes of the match. The final score was Souths 30, Canterbury 6.

Souths' Sam Burgess played the entire match, despite fracturing his cheekbone and eye socket in contact in the opening tackle with James Graham. He was awarded the Clive Churchill Medal, as the man of the match in the grand final.  Souths player Dave Tyrrell was stretchered from the field after he was knocked out in the 68th minute following a head clash with Canterbury player James Graham.

Fullback Greg Inglis, who scored the final try of the game in the final minute of play, won his first valid premiership ring after previously featuring in the Melbourne Storm's 2007 and 2009 sides which had their premierships stripped from them due to salary cap breaches.

Opening Games

U20s Grand Final

NRL State Championship

Entertainment

Former Guns N' Roses guitarist Slash performed "Bent To Fly" from World on Fire, with the accompanying vocal track by Myles Kennedy being played over loudspeaker. The performance of the song was accompanied by a montage of the 2014 NRL season on ANZ Stadium's screens. Slash also performed the guitar riff from Guns N' Roses' "Sweet Child o' Mine", before closing the set with an improvised solo.

Train performed as the main act, playing "Hey, Soul Sister", "Angel in Blue Jeans", and "Drops of Jupiter".

Match Officials
Shayne Hayne and Gerard Sutton were the match referees. It was Hayne's fourth grand final as he has officiated in the 2009, 2010 and 2013 grand finals. It was Sutton's first grand final as referee.

Steve Carrol and Jason Walsh were the touch judges, and the video referees were Bernard Sutton and Luke Phillips. The standby referee was Ben Cummins and the standby touch judge was Brett Suttor.

Records
The 2014 NRL Grand Final was the most-watched club game in the history of rugby league, with a five-city average television audience of 2.597 million, with a peak of 3.098 million viewers. Combined with 1.354 million regional viewers tuning in, the game had an average audience of 3.951 million viewers, and a national peak audience of 4.650 million viewers.

The crowd of 83,833 was the largest attendance at a sporting event at Stadium Australia since its 2001 reconfiguration.

Post-match

Souths' premiership victory qualified them for the 2015 World Club Challenge, their first ever appearance in the end of year event, in which they beat St. Helens RFC 39-0 at Langtree Park.

See also

2014 NRL season
NRL Premiership winners

References

External links

2014 NRL Finals Series website
2014 Holden Cup Grand Final

NRL Grand Finals
Canterbury-Bankstown Bulldogs matches
South Sydney Rabbitohs matches
Grand Final